Dharmender Phagna (born 29 September 1984) is an Indian first-class cricketer who has played for Haryana cricket team in a single first-class cricket match.

He was also the member of the Indian cricket team at the 2012 Hong Kong Cricket Sixes

References

External links 
 
 

1984 births
Living people
Indian cricketers
Haryana cricketers
People from Faridabad